Lee Eun-kyung  (born 1 February 1961) is a South Korean female volleyball player and coach.

She was part of the South Korea women's national volleyball team at the 1984 Summer Olympic Games.

Lee attended  in Busan. She represented her school at the 10th President's Cup Volleyball Championships in Gwangju in 1975 and in the high school division of the 33rd National Men's and Women's Classified Volleyball Championships in Daejeon in 1978.

After her graduation in 1978, she played for Hyundai. The Korea Corporate Volleyball Federation honoured her with its Player of the Year Award in 1981.

Notes

References 

1961 births
Living people
South Korean women's volleyball players
Volleyball players at the 1984 Summer Olympics
Olympic volleyball players of South Korea
Volleyball players at the 1982 Asian Games
Volleyball players at the 1986 Asian Games
Asian Games medalists in volleyball
Asian Games bronze medalists for South Korea
Medalists at the 1982 Asian Games
Medalists at the 1986 Asian Games